is a village located in Nagano Prefecture, Japan. , the village had an estimated population of 4,569 in 1533 households, and a population density of 63.4 persons per km².

Geography
Nagawa is located in the centre of Nagano Prefecture within the Matsumoto Basin. Mount Hachimori (2446 meters) is the highest elevation in the village. The Shin-Shinano Frequency Converter Station is located in Asahi.

Climate
The village has a climate characterized by characterized by cool humid summers, and cold winters with heavy snowfall (Köppen climate classification Dfa).  The average annual temperature in Asahi is 9.1 °C. The average annual rainfall is 1453 mm with September as the wettest month. The temperatures are highest on average in August, at around 22.4 °C, and lowest in January, at around -3.1 °C.

Surrounding municipalities
Nagano Prefecture
 Matsumoto
 Shiojiri
 Yamagata
 Kiso

History
The area of present-day Nagawa was part of ancient Shinano Province. Most of the area was part of the holdings of Matsumoto Domain, with a portion held by Takatō Domain during the Edo period. The village of Asahi was established on April 1, 1889 by the establishment of the modern municipalities system.

Demographics 
Per Japanese census data, the population of Asahi has remained relatively stable over the past 80 years.

Education
Asahi has one public elementary schools and one public middle school operated jointly between Asahi and neighboring Yamagata village. The village does not have a high school.

Transportation

Railway
The village does not have any passenger railway service.

Highway
The village is not located on any national highway.

References

External links

Official Website 

 
Villages in Nagano Prefecture